Atanas Kurdov (born 28 September 1988) is a Bulgarian footballer who plays as a forward for Botev Ihtiman. His father is former player and manager Petar Kurdov.

Career

Youth career
Kurdov is a product of the Levski Sofia's Youth Academy. In 2007, he spent weeks on a trial period in Celtic FC and Tottenham Hotspur. All in all, Kurdov signed for Bayer 04 Leverkusen.

Bayer 04 Leverkusen
On 9 July 2007, Kurdov signed a four-year contract with Bayer 04 Leverkusen. In his first season there, Atanas capped 26 times and scored 10 goals for the reserves team. In the summer of 2010 he was released from the club.

Botev Plovdiv
After being released from Bayer 04 Leverkusen he signed with Bulgarian V AFG side Botev Plovdiv on 24 August, despite being wanted by his youth club Levski Sofia earlier that summer. He was top scorer in the third tier in 2010–11, with 46 goals in the South East V FG. He also scored 3 goals in 3 minutes against Stambolovo. In January 2011, Kurdov was approached by newly promoted A PFG club Ludogorets Razgrad, but his transfer fell through, due to the accusations of being a glory seeker from the Botev fans. On June 26, 2012, he was released from Botev Plovdiv along with 15 other players.

Lokomotiv Plovdiv
After a one-week trial, on 25 August 2012, Kurdov joined Botev's eternal rivals Lokomotiv Plovdiv on a year contract. His move to Lokomotiv remains very controversial keeping in mind his family's history with Botev (his father and older brother Evgeni also played for Botev).

FC Astana
On 26 February 2014, Kurdov signed for Kazakhstan Premier League side Astana. On 19 April, he scored three goals in the 4:3 away win over Irtysh Pavlodar in a Kazakhstan Premier League match.

Levski Sofia
He returned to his youth club Levski Sofia in the summer 2015, but had difficulty establishing himself as a regular player under manager Stoycho Stoev and parted ways with the "bluemen" in November.

Lokomotiv Sofia
On 29 June 2017, Kurdov signed a 1-year contract with Lokomotiv Sofia. On 3 August 2017, Kurdov released his contract with club.

Slivnishki Geroy
In February 2019, Kurdov joined FC Slivnishki Geroy Slivnitsa.

Honours 
Astana
 Kazakhstan Premier League (1): 2014

References

External links
 Kurdov at IMScouting
 

1988 births
Living people
Footballers from Plovdiv
Bulgarian footballers
Bulgaria under-21 international footballers
Bulgarian expatriate footballers
Bayer 04 Leverkusen players
Bayer 04 Leverkusen II players
FC Winterthur players
Botev Plovdiv players
PFC Lokomotiv Plovdiv players
PFC Slavia Sofia players
FC Astana players
PFC Levski Sofia players
PFC Velbazhd Kyustendil players
PFC Litex Lovech players
FC Lokomotiv 1929 Sofia players
Swiss Challenge League players
First Professional Football League (Bulgaria) players
Second Professional Football League (Bulgaria) players
Kazakhstan Premier League players
Bulgarian expatriate sportspeople in Kazakhstan
Expatriate footballers in Kazakhstan
Bulgarian expatriate sportspeople in Germany
Expatriate footballers in Germany
Bulgarian expatriate sportspeople in Switzerland
Expatriate footballers in Switzerland
Association football forwards